The Giant Metrewave Radio Telescope (GMRT), located near Narayangaon, Pune in India, is an array of thirty fully steerable parabolic radio telescopes of 45 metre diameter, observing at metre wavelengths. It is the largest and most sensitive radio telescope array in the world at low frequencies. It is operated by the National Centre for Radio Astrophysics (NCRA), a part of the Tata Institute of Fundamental Research, Mumbai. It was conceived and built under the direction of Late Prof. Govind Swarup during 1984 to 1996. It was recently upgraded with new receivers, after which it is also known as the upgraded Giant Metrewave Radio Telescope (uGMRT).

Location
The GMRT Observatory is located about 80 km north of Pune at Khodad. A nearby town is Narayangaon which is around 9 km from the telescope site. The office of NCRA is located in the Savitribai Phule Pune University campus.

Science and observations
One of the aims for the telescope during its development was to search for the highly redshifted 21-cm line radiation from primordial neutral hydrogen clouds in order to determine the epoch of galaxy formation in the universe.

Astronomers from all over the world regularly use this telescope to observe many different astronomical objects such as HII regions, galaxies, pulsars, supernovae, and Sun and solar winds.

In August 2018, the most distant galaxy ever known, located at a distance of 12 billion light years, was discovered by GMRT.

In February 2020, it helped in the observation of the biggest explosion in the history of the universe, the Ophiuchus Supercluster explosion.

In January 2023, the telescope picked up a radio signal which originated from 8.8 billion light years away.

Activities
Each year on National Science Day the observatory invites the public and pupils from schools and colleges in the surrounding area to visit the site where they can listen to explanations of radio astronomy, receiver technology and astronomy from the engineers and astronomers who work there. Nearby schools/colleges are also invited to put their individual science experiments in exhibition and the best one in each level (primary, secondary school and Jr. college) are awarded.

Visitors are allowed into GMRT only on Fridays in two sessions - Morning (1100 hrs - 1300 hrs) and Evening (1500 hrs to 1700 hrs).

See also
 List of radio telescopes

References

External links

 GMRT Homepage
 Y-shaped array
 Visit GMRT
 GMRT Visit 

Radio telescopes
Interferometric telescopes
Astronomical observatories in India
Tata Institute of Fundamental Research
1995 establishments in Maharashtra
Pune district
Research institutes in Maharashtra